Simon Ritter Cobblestone Farmhouse is a historic house located at Varick in Seneca County, New York.  It is a late Federal / early Greek Revival style, cobblestone farmhouse with an overlay of Italianate detailing.  It is a two-story, slightly asymmetrical structure, on a raised fieldstone foundation. It was built about 1830 and is constructed of irregularly sized and variously colored field cobbles. The house is among the approximately 18 surviving cobblestone buildings in Seneca County.  Also on the property are two large early / mid 19th century barns, a carriage house and machine shed, a boathouse built about 1900 on the shore of Cayuga Lake, and a limestone carriage stepping stone.

It was listed on the National Register of Historic Places in 2008. The owners operate Varick Winery, which has a tasting room on another part of the property.

References

Houses on the National Register of Historic Places in New York (state)
Greek Revival houses in New York (state)
Cobblestone architecture
Houses completed in 1830
Houses in Seneca County, New York
1830 establishments in New York (state)
National Register of Historic Places in Seneca County, New York